The Academy of Aerospace and Engineering (also known as AAE, Aerospace, and Aerospace and Engineering) is a regional magnet high school located in Windsor, Connecticut. The school's half-day program operates as the Greater Hartford Academy of Mathematics And Science (also known as GHAMAS). The building houses a grade 6-12 program. It is run by the Capitol Region Education Council (CREC), one of 6 Regional Educational Service Centers (RESC) in Connecticut. Trinity College has been involved in some of the projects with GHAMAS, such as the Brain Bee, a neuroscience competition. Hartford Hospital is involved in school activities as well.

The Academy of Aerospace and Engineering was built as GHAMAS in 1999. Labs at the Academy include the Robotics, Physics, Earth Science, Biology, Cell Culture, Greenhouse & Potting, Biochemistry, Chemistry, Special Instrumentation, and Engineering Labs. There are also several smaller student laboratories which are used by students to conduct independent research through a senior design and research course called Capstone. Occasionally, speakers from industry or academia come to lecture full-day and morning half-day students (grades 9 and 10) about the field that they work in and educate them to possible careers in that field. Students partake in a variety of clubs at the high school level, including competitive FIRST Tech Challenge robotics and debate teams. Select students pursue scientific research and engineering projects throughout the year and present their work at the Connecticut Science and Engineering Fair. Each year, some students that have presented exemplary work are chosen by CSEF to compete in the International Science and Engineering Fair

AAE has historically been an exclusively half-day program operating as GHAMAS and is now solely a full-day program operating as AAE. Since the fall of 2011, the school holds 9-12 grade half-day, and 6-12 grade full-day students. Ninth and tenth-grade students take three foundation math (Algebra I, Geometry, Algebra II, Pre-calculus, or higher) and science (Physics, Earth Science, Biology, and Chemistry) courses in the morning, followed by humanities and other classes at their sending district's high school or with the full-day program. Half-day juniors and seniors take these humanities at their home schools during the morning and join the AAE juniors and seniors for up to four advanced elective courses in the afternoon, such as Molecular and Cellular Biology, Anatomy, Zoology, or Astronomy, along with Advanced Placement curricula.

AAE is a member of the NCSSSMST. This is an organization of secondary schools that promote Mathematics, Science, and Technology schools. Greater Hartford Academy of Math and Science has been involved as a NASA Explorer School. It is one of only three such schools in Connecticut. The director of both the high school and middle school academies is Adam Johnson.

History
On January 9, 2010, a bus carrying GHAMAS students to a robotics competition in Farmington, CT was involved in an accident and left one student, Vikas Parikh, dead, and 17 others injured.

The Academy of Aerospace and Engineering Elementary school was established in Rocky Hill, Connecticut as a Kindergarten through Fifth-grade program.

In 2015, a new educational facility was built in Windsor, Connecticut that combined both the middle school and high school programs under the same administrative body. Prior to the new facility, Middle school students studied on the Birken Campus in Bloomfield, CT while High school students studied at the Learning Corridor Campus in Hartford, CT. The first graduating class from the Windsor campus was the Class of 2019.

In 2017, Adam Johnson was appointed as principal to both the high school and middle school programs.

See also

Greater Hartford Academy of the Arts

References

External links
GHAMAS Information from the Capital Region Education Council
GHAMAS Information from The Learning Corridor

NCSSS schools
Public high schools in Connecticut
Magnet schools in Connecticut